The Dead Hand: The Untold Story of the Cold War Arms Race and its Dangerous Legacy is a 2009 book written by David E. Hoffman, a Washington Post contributing editor. It was the winner of the 2010 Pulitzer Prize for General Non-Fiction.

The book is based on a large number of published and unpublished sources, including interviews with political leaders, scientists, military officials and diplomats. The Russian automatic nuclear-control system known as "Dead Hand" is described in detail.

See also
 Dr. Strangelove

External links 
 
 Review in New York Times
Discussion on The Dead Hand with Hoffman, Woodrow Wilson International Center, October 19, 2009
Discussion on The Dead Hand with Hoffman, National Book Festival, September 25, 2010
 Home page for The Dead Hand
 Article by Peter Preston in the Guardian

Pulitzer Prize for General Non-Fiction-winning works
2009 non-fiction books
Doubleday (publisher) books